Madumongso or madumangsa is a Javanese snack made from black sticky rice as a basic ingredient. The taste is mixed with sweet because the black rice is previously processed before it becomes tapai (through the fermentation process) and cooked become dodol. Madumongso originates from Ponorogo, East Java.

See also
 List of rice dishes
 Dodol
 Tapai

References

Indonesian snack foods
Javanese cuisine
Confectionery